Tikait Nagar is a town and a nagar panchayat in Barabanki district in the Indian state of Uttar Pradesh.

Demographics
 India census, Tikait Nagar had a population of 8,246. Males constitute 53% of the population and females 47%. Tikait Nagar has an average literacy rate of 54%, lower than the national average of 59.5%: male literacy is 59%, and female literacy is 49%. In Tikait Nagar, 16% of the population is under 6 years of age.

References

Cities and towns in Barabanki district